Princess Marie of Windisch-Graetz (11 December 1856 – 9 August 1929) was an Austrian noblewoman and a noted archaeologist.

Early life and ancestry 
Princess Marie Gabriele Ernestine Alexandra was born in Vienna in 1856 as the daughter of Hugo, Prince of Windisch-Grätz (himself son of Weriand, Prince of Windisch-Graetz and Princess Maria Eleonore Carolina of Lobkowicz) and his wife, Duchess Louise of Mecklenburg-Schwerin (herself the eldest daughter of Grand Duke Paul Frederick and Princess Alexandrine of Prussia).

Biography
In Schwerin on 5 May 1881, she married her first cousin, the German-born Duke Paul Frederick of Mecklenburg-Schwerin, second son of Frederick Francis II, Grand Duke of Mecklenburg-Schwerin, and his wife, Princess Augusta Reuss of Köstritz. The couple had three surviving children, all of whom were raised as Roman Catholics, Marie's religion, and lived a quiet life in Venice, where they befriended Cardinal Sarto (later Pope Pius X), who often visited the family and acted as their spiritual advisor.

On 21 April 1884 Duke Paul Frederick deferred his and his sons' rights of succession to Mecklenburg-Schwerin in favour of his younger brothers and their sons, so they would take precedence over him and his. In 1887 her husband, raised a Lutheran, converted to Roman Catholicism, the religion of his wife and their common children.

Marie née Windisch-Graetz surveyed several archaeological excavations in Austria and Carniola, including excavations at Hallstatt Archaeological Site in Vače. Some of the artifacts were sold to museums in Harvard, Oxford and Berlin by her daughter Duchess Marie Antoinette of Mecklenburg.

In 1906 after raising the concerns of his nephew Frederick Francis IV, Grand Duke of Mecklenburg, about his expenses Duke Paul Frederick and his wife were ordered to submit expenditures to the comptroller of the royal household.

Children
 Duke Paul Friedrich of Mecklenburg (1882–1904)
 Duchess Marie Louise of Mecklenburg (1883–1883)
 Duchess Marie Antoinette of Mecklenburg (1884–1944)
 Duke Henry Borwin of Mecklenburg (1885–1942) married 1. Elizabeth Tibbits Pratt (1860-1928); 2. Natália Oelrichs (1880-1931) and 3. Karola Ernestine von Alers (1882-1974), daughter of Wilhelm Karl Georg von Alers and Adelaide Marie Pauline Ernstine von Chamisso de Boncourt.
 Duke Joseph of Mecklenburg (1889–1889)

References

Literature 
 Viola Maier: Die Herzogin Marie von Mecklenburg-Schwerin (1856–1929). In: Julia K. Koch, Eva-Maria Mertens (eds.): Eine Dame zwischen 500 Herren. Johanna Mestorf, Werk und Wirkung (= Frauen, Forschung, Archäologie. Bd. 4). Waxmann, Münster etc., 2002, pp. 257–265.
 Andrea Rottloff: Archäologen (= Die Berühmten). Philipp von Zabern, Mainz 2009,  pp. 87–89.
 

1856 births
1929 deaths
Austrian princesses
Duchesses of Mecklenburg-Schwerin
House of Mecklenburg-Schwerin
People from Ludwigslust
Windisch-Graetz
Austrian women archaeologists
Archaeologists from Vienna
Nobility from Vienna